Xenotilapia spiloptera is a species of cichlid endemic to Lake Tanganyika where it prefers areas with sandy substrates.  This species can reach a length of  TL.  It can also be found in the aquarium trade.

References

External links
 Photograph

spiloptera
Cichlid fish of Africa
Fish of Lake Tanganyika
Fish of Burundi
Fish of the Democratic Republic of the Congo
Fish of Tanzania
Fish of Zambia
Fish described in 1975
Taxonomy articles created by Polbot